The Phantom in the House is a 1929 American talking film directed by Phil Rosen and starring Ricardo Cortez. A silent version was prepared for released in theatres not yet equipped for sound.

This is a surviving in a European archive and is available on home video.

Cast 
Ricardo Cortez as Paul Wallis
Nancy Welford as Dorothy Milburn
Henry B. Walthall as Boyd Milburn
Grace Valentine as Peggy Milburn
Jack Curtis as "Biffer" Bill
Thomas A. Curran as Judge Thompson
John Beck
John Elliott as Police Captain
Larry Steers
Henry Roquemore

References

External links 

The Phantom in the House at tcm.com

1929 films
1929 crime drama films
American black-and-white films
Films based on British novels
Films directed by Phil Rosen
American crime drama films
Transitional sound films
1920s English-language films
1920s American films